The 33rd Mechanized Infantry Brigade 33η Μηχανοκίνητη Ταξιαρχία "Σύνταγμα Κυδωνίαι' is a unit of the Hellenic Army based in Polykastro, Macedonia.

Structure 
 HQ Company (ΙΣΤ)
 33rd Armored Battalion (33 ΕΜΑ)
 506th Mechanized Infantry Battalion (506 M/K ΤΠ)
 525th Mechanized Infantry Battalion (525 M/K ΤΠ)
 104th Self Propelled Artillery Battalion (104 Α/K ΜΜΠ)
 33rd Antitank Company (33 ΛΑΤ)
 33rd Engineer Company (33 ΛΜΧ)
 33rd Signal Company (33 ΛΔΒ)
 33rd Support Battalion (33 ΤΥΠ)

References
Charles Heyman. "ARRC Groupings" in The Armed Forces of the United Kingdom 1999-2000. Leo Cooper. Pen & Sword Books. R & F (Defence Publications). 1998. . Page 181.

External links
 Hellenic Ministry of Defense - Official Site
 Hellenic Army General Staff - Official Site

Mechanized infantry brigades of Greece